The 1977 South African Open, also known by its sponsored name SAB Open, was a combined men's and women's tennis tournament played on outdoor hard courts in Johannesburg, South Africa. The men's tournament was part of the 1977 Colgate-Palmolive Grand Prix while the women's event was part of the 1977–1978 Colgate International Series. It was the 74th edition of the tournament and was held from 28 November through 6 December 1977. Guillermo Vilas and Linky Boshoff won the singles titles.

Finals

Men's singles
 Guillermo Vilas defeated  Buster Mottram 7–6, 6–3, 6–4

Women's singles
 Linky Boshoff defeated  Brigitte Cuypers 6–1, 6–4

Men's doubles
 Bob Lutz /  Stan Smith defeated  Peter Fleming /  Raymond Moore 6–3, 7–5, 6–7, 7–6

Women's doubles
 Ilana Kloss /  Linky Boshoff defeated  Brigitte Cuypers /  Marise Kruger 5–7, 6–3, 6–3

Mixed doubles
 Linky Boshoff /  Colin Dowdeswell defeated  Ilana Kloss /  Sherwood Stewart 6–4, 4–6. 7–5

References

External links
 ITF – Johannesburg tournament details

South African Open
South African Open (tennis)
Open
Sports competitions in Johannesburg
1970s in Johannesburg
November 1977 sports events in Africa
December 1977 sports events in Africa